The Angels of the District (Italian: Gli Angeli del quartiere) is a 1952 Italian drama film directed by Carlo Borghesio and starring Rossana Podestà, Jacques Sernas and Marisa Merlini. The film's sets were designed by the art director Luigi Ricci while the score was composed by Nino Rota.

Plot 
Italy in the early 1950s. Five children whose parents died in World War II live in the dilapidated basement of an old apartment building. One night, Virgola, the youngest of them, discovers several boxes in an adjoining room, all of which are filled with 1,000 lira bills. The boys, who have suddenly become infinitely rich, decide not to tell any adults their secret, but soon have to realize that they cannot do without an adult to manage the money and shop for them. So they take Mario, a pickpocket, into their midst. Although Mario originally only wanted the boys' money and wanted to steal from them, the children's genuine affection and trust transforms him into a better person. He is now making every effort to break away from his shady and criminal cronies in order to start a new life. Then he and the children become secret benefactors. They help and give gifts to the poor, the elderly and above all to the children of the city. Eventually they leave all the money to the nuns at a hospital. After Mario was able to free himself from his past, he married an acquaintance of the children. Everyone is happy and content now.

Cast
 Enzo Cerusico as Il Capo 
 Giancarlo Nicotra as Virgola
 Giampiero Sciommari as Sonno
 Nicola Gallo as Ta-Tà 
 Ciccio Jacono as Carnera 
 Jacques Sernas as Mario
 Rossana Podestà as Lisa 
 Marisa Merlini as Gianna 
 Nico Pepe as Giuseppe 
 Virgilio Riento as Cecco

References

Bibliography
 Borin, Fabrizio. La filmografia di Nino Rota. L.O. Olschki, 1999.

External links 
 

1952 films
Films scored by Nino Rota
1950s Italian-language films
Films directed by Carlo Borghesio
Italian drama films
1952 drama films
Italian black-and-white films
1950s Italian films